Hypertonia is a term sometimes used synonymously with spasticity and rigidity in the literature surrounding damage to the central nervous system, namely upper motor neuron lesions. Impaired ability of damaged motor neurons to regulate descending pathways gives rise to disordered spinal reflexes, increased excitability of muscle spindles, and decreased synaptic inhibition. These consequences result in abnormally increased muscle tone of symptomatic muscles. Some authors suggest that the current definition for spasticity, the velocity-dependent over-activity of the stretch reflex, is not sufficient as it fails to take into account patients exhibiting increased muscle tone in the absence of stretch reflex over-activity. They instead suggest that "reversible hypertonia" is more appropriate and represents a treatable condition that is responsive to various therapy modalities like drug and/or physical therapy.

Presentation
Symptoms associated with central nervous systems disorders are classified into positive and negative categories. Positive symptoms include those that increase muscle activity through hyper-excitability of the stretch reflex (i.e., rigidity and spasticity) where negative symptoms include those of insufficient muscle activity (i.e. weakness) and reduced motor function. Often the two classifications are thought to be separate entities of a disorder; however, some authors propose that they may be closely related.

Pathophysiology
Hypertonia is caused by upper motor neuron lesions which may result from injury, disease, or conditions that involve damage to the central nervous system.  The lack of or decrease in upper motor neuron function leads to loss of inhibition with resultant hyperactivity of lower motor neurons.  Different patterns of muscle weakness or hyperactivity can occur based on the location of the lesion, causing a multitude of neurological symptoms, including spasticity, rigidity, or dystonia.

Spastic hypertonia involves uncontrollable muscle spasms, stiffening or straightening out of muscles, shock-like contractions of all or part of a group of muscles, and abnormal muscle tone. It is seen in disorders such as cerebral palsy, stroke, and spinal cord injury.  Rigidity is a severe state of hypertonia where muscle resistance occurs throughout the entire range of motion of the affected joint independent of velocity. It is frequently associated with lesions of the basal ganglia. Individuals with rigidity present with stiffness, decreased range of motion and loss of motor control.  Dystonic hypertonia refers to muscle resistance to passive stretching (in which a therapist gently stretches the inactive contracted muscle to a comfortable length at very low speeds of movement) and a tendency of a limb to return to a fixed involuntary (and sometimes abnormal) posture following movement.

Management
Therapeutic interventions are best individualized to particular patients. Basic principles of treatment for hypertonia are to avoid noxious stimuli and provide frequent range of motion exercise.

Physical interventions
Physiotherapy has been shown to be effective in controlling hypertonia through the use of stretching aimed to reduce motor neuron excitability. The aim of a physical therapy session could be to inhibit excessive tone as far as possible, give the patient a sensation of normal position and movement, and to facilitate normal movement patterns. While static stretch has been the classical means to increase range of motion, PNF stretching has been used in many clinical settings to effectively reduce muscle spasticity.

Icing and other topical anesthetics may decrease the reflexive activity for short period of time in order to facilitate motor function.  Inhibitory pressure (applying firm pressure over muscle tendon) and promoting body heat retention and rhythmic rotation (slow repeated rotation of affected body part to stimulate relaxation) have also been proposed as potential methods to decrease hypertonia.  Aside from static stretch casting, splinting techniques are extremely valuable to extend joint range of motion lost to hypertonicity.  A more unconventional method for limiting tone is to deploy quick repeated passive movements to an involved joint in cyclical fashion; this has also been demonstrated to show results on persons without physical disabilities. For a more permanent state of improvement, exercise and patient education is imperative. Isokinetic, aerobic, and strength training exercises should be performed as prescribed by a physiotherapist, and stressful situations that may cause increased tone should be minimized or avoided.

Pharmaceutical interventions
Baclofen, diazepam and dantrolene remain the three most commonly used pharmacologic agents in the treatment of spastic hypertonia. Baclofen is generally the drug of choice for spinal cord types of spasticity, while sodium dantrolene is the only agent which acts directly on muscle tissue. Tizanidine is also available. Phenytoin with chlorpromazine may be potentially useful if sedation does not limit their use. Ketazolam, not yet available in the United States, may be a significant addition to the pharmacologic set of options. Intrathecal administration of antispastic medications allows for high concentrations of drug near the site of action, which limits side effects.

See also
 Dystonia
 Hypotonia
 Spasticity
 Clasp-knife response

References

External links 

Cerebral palsy types
Symptoms and signs: Nervous system
Muscular disorders
Pediatrics